Martyn J. Fogg (born 3 July 1960) is a British physicist and geologist, an expert on terraforming.

Biography 
After becoming a dental surgeon, Martyn John Fogg graduated in physics and geology and a master in astrophysics. He obtained his M.S. in astrophysics at Queen Mary College of the University of London with a thesis on origin and distribution of free-floating planets in 2002, and a Ph.D in planetary science with work on the dynamics of planetary formation involving the modelling of the formation of terrestrial planets in the presence of giant planet migration in 2008. Fogg lives in London.

Research

Contributions to global engineering 
Fogg's scientific work started in 1985, with work on simulating extrasolar planetary systems. Starting in 1987, Fogg began research on terraforming, and published a series of articles on the subject, primarily in the Journal of the British Interplanetary Society.  He served as guest editor for a special issue on the subject in 1991. In 1995 this work culminated in the book Terraforming: Engineering Planetary Environments, the first textbook on the subject of terraforming.

In addition to Journal of the British Interplanetary Society, he has published in various journals including: Icarus, Astronomy and Astrophysics, Comments on Astrophysics,  Advances in Space Research. and Earth, Moon, and Planets, as well as presenting papers at various scientific and technical conferences.Planetary migration
Since the 2000s, his research has focused on dynamics of planet formation, and the effects of the migration of planets such as hot Jupiters on early solar system formation.Fogg, Martyn J., and Nelson, Richard P. (2007). "The effect of type I migration on the formation of terrestrial planets in hot-Jupiter systems." Astronomy & Astrophysics 472.3, pp. 1003-1015.

 See also 
 Terraformation

 References 

 Bibliography 
Book
 M. J. Fogg, Terraforming: Engineering Planetary Environments, SAE Press, 1995.

 Reviews 
 Book review: Terraforming: Engineering Planetary Environments, Martyn J. Fogg, Geoffrey Landis, NASA Glenn Research Center
 Book Review: Terraforming: Engineering Planetary Environments, D. P. McKay, NASA Ames Research Center, Moffett Field, Californie, in Icarus, volume 130, n°2, p. 552.

Articles available online
 Free-Floating Planets: Their Origin and Distribution, Master Thesis
 Terraforming Mars: A Review of Research
 Oligarchic and giant impact growth of terrestrial planets in the presence of gas giant migration, in Astronomy and Astrophysics vol. 441, p. 791–806, 2005
 Artesian Basins on Mars: Implications for Settlement, Life-Search and Terraforming, Mars Society
 The Ethical Dimensions of Space Settlement, International Astronautical Congress, International Academy of Astronautics, Amsterdam, 1999, in Space Policy'', 16, 205-211, 2000

External links 
The Terraforming Information Pages

1960 births
Living people
21st-century British astronomers